Ellamar Mountain is a prominent  mountain summit located in the Chugach Mountains, in the U.S. state of Alaska. The mountain's local name was taken from the copper mining camp of "Ellamar" at the southwest base of the mountain. In turn, Ellamar is a portmanteau of Ella and Margaret. When a post office was established for this new mining camp, C. L. Wayland, the first Postal Inspector for the Territory of Alaska and parts of the Pacific Northwest, coined Ellamar from the names of his wife, Ella, and daughter, Margaret. Precipitation runoff from the mountain drains into Prince William Sound.

Climate

Based on the Köppen climate classification, Ellamar Mountain is located in a subarctic climate zone with long, cold, snowy winters, and cool summers. Weather systems coming off the Gulf of Alaska are forced upwards by the Chugach Mountains (orographic lift), causing heavy precipitation in the form of rainfall and snowfall. Temperatures can drop below −20 °C with wind chill factors below −30 °C. The months May through June offer the most favorable weather for viewing and climbing.

See also

List of mountain peaks of Alaska
Geography of Alaska

References

External links
 Weather forecast: Ellamar Mountain

Mountains of Alaska
Landforms of Chugach Census Area, Alaska